County of Lytton may refer to:
 County of Lytton, Queensland
 County of Lytton (South Australia)